Gill is a rural unincorporated community in south central Harrison County, Texas, United States. It is six miles south of the county seat, Marshall, on U.S. Route 59.

External links
 

Unincorporated communities in Texas
Unincorporated communities in Harrison County, Texas